NGC 4860 is an elliptical galaxy in the constellation Coma Berenices. The galaxy was discovered on 21 April 1865 by Heinrich Louis d'Arrest.

With its distance from Earth being approximately 110 million parsecs, NGC 4860 belongs to the Coma Cluster, which consists of over 1,000 identified galaxies.

See also 
 List of galaxies
 Comet Galaxy

References

External links 
 
 Deep Sky Catalog

4860
Coma Cluster
Coma Berenices
Elliptical galaxies
044539